The 2012 Copa Claro was a men's tennis tournament played on outdoor clay courts. It was the 15th edition of the Copa Claro, and it was part of the ATP World Tour 250 series of the 2012 ATP World Tour. It took place in Buenos Aires, Argentina, from February 18 through February 26, 2012. David Ferrer won the singles title.

Singles main draw entrants

Seeds

 Rankings are as of February 13, 2012

Other entrants
The following players received wildcards into the main draw:
 Facundo Bagnis
 Fernando González
 Horacio Zeballos

The following players received entry from the qualifying draw:
 Igor Andreev
 Federico Delbonis
 Javier Martí
 Andrés Molteni

The following player received entry as lucky loser:
 Wayne Odesnik

Withdrawals
  Thomaz Bellucci (ankle injury)

Retirements
  Albert Montañés (back injury)
  Filippo Volandri (right ankle injury)

Doubles main draw entrants

Seeds

 Rankings are as of February 13, 2012

Other entrants
The following pairs received wildcards into the doubles main draw:
  Facundo Argüello /  Agustín Velotti
  Federico Delbonis /  Diego Junqueira

The following pair received entry as alternates:
  Nikola Ćirić /  Marcel Felder

Withdrawals
  Albert Montañés (back injury)

Finals

Singles

 David Ferrer defeated  Nicolás Almagro 4–6, 6–3, 6–2
It was Ferrer's 2nd title of the year and 13th of his career.

Doubles

 David Marrero /  Fernando Verdasco defeated  Michal Mertiňák /  André Sá 6–4, 6–4

References

External links

ITF tournament edition details

Copa Claro
ATP Buenos Aires
Copa
Copa Claro